The Pio Monte della Misericordia  is a church in the historic center of Naples, southern Italy. It is famous for its art works, including Caravaggio's The Seven Works of Mercy.
A charity brotherhood  (Pio Monte della Misericordia meaning "Pious Mount of Mercy" in Italian) was founded in August 1601 by seven young nobles, who met every Friday at the Hospital for Incurables and ministered to the sick.

In 1602 they established an institution and commissioned a small church, built by Gian Giacomo di Conforto, near the staircase leading to the Cathedral, on the corner of the Via dei Tribunali and the Vico dei Zuroli. In 1605, they received an apostolic letter from Pope Paul V, according special privileges to the high altar.

The church was consecrated in September 1606. From 1658 to 1678 the edifice was enlarged, also with the annexation of neighbouring structures, by architect Francesco Antonio Picchiati, forming a complex with a palace and a renewed church.

The latter, at the high altar, houses Caravaggio's Seven Works of Mercy. There are also paintings by Luca Giordano, Carlo Sellitto, Fabrizio Santafede, Battistello Caracciolo and others.

The noblemen of the brotherhood at Pio Monte della Misericordia were looking for painters "to give permanent visual expression to their sense of charitable mission”. Regarding the sharp contrasts of the chiaroscuro in Caravaggio's painting’s, the German art historian Ralf van Bühren explains the bright light as a metaphor for mercy, which "helps the audience to explore mercy in their own lives".

References

Bibliography

 Ralf van Bühren, "Caravaggio’s ‘Seven Works of Mercy’ in Naples. The relevance of art history to cultural journalism", in Church, Communication and Culture 2 (2017), pp. 63–87
 Andrew Graham-Dixon, Caravaggio. A Life Sacred and Profane, London: Allen Lane, Penguin Books 2010
 Helen Langdon, Caravaggio, Random House 2012 - .

External links
Pio Monte della Misericordia Official website
Virtual tour of the Pio Monte della Misericordia provided by Google Arts & Culture

 
Roman Catholic churches completed in 1606
17th-century Roman Catholic church buildings in Italy
Art museums and galleries in Naples
Churches in Naples
1602 establishments in Italy